Helstar is an American heavy metal band formed in Houston, Texas, in 1982 by guitarist Larry Barragan. They were an influential force in the American power metal genre emerging in the mid-1980s.

History

Early days and Combat-era (1982–1986)
Helstar began with a basic heavy metal style in 1983 with two demos, followed by their first studio album in 1984 titled Burning Star for Combat Records, making them label mates with Megadeth and Exodus. Struggles within the band and management issues led to changes in the band's line-up. After a year they released the Remnants of War album, also on Combat, produced by Randy Burns. The band played their first arena show in December 1985 opening for Stryper at the Sam Houston Coliseum.

Metal Blade-era (1987–1989)
In 1987, they briefly moved to Los Angeles with another line-up change, with guitarist Rob Trevino departing, and it is believed that the song "Abandon Ship", from the 1988 album A Distant Thunder, was dedicated to his departure. Along with guitarist André Corbin, Frank Ferreira was an addition to drums. They returned to Houston in 1988, signed with Metal Blade Records and recorded the A Distant Thunder album produced by Bill Metoyer. The band subsequently toured as openers for acts such as Yngwie Malmsteen, Anthrax, Megadeth, Slayer, Exodus, and Armored Saint.

In 1989, the band released Nosferatu, which many fans consider their greatest album. It was based on the early Dracula film and contained spoken sound bites from the 1979 adaptation. Shortly after a tour of the album, the band recorded a four-song demo which did not gain interest from labels. André Corbin, Frank Ferreria, and Larry Barragan left the band in 1990 to pursue other interests, essentially ending the group for the time being.

Demos, Multiples of Black, and hiatuses (1990–2000)
Between 1990 and 1993, Helstar released a few demos that failed to receive great recognition. In 1995, Helstar released a new David Ellefson-produced studio album, entitled Multiples of Black, but did not achieve the quality from earlier albums, and fans consider it their worst release.

The members of Helstar, namely James Rivera, cooperated in other bands between 1993 and 2002: Seven Witches for a short time in 1993, Distant Thunder in 1995, Chaotic Order in 1997, and Destiny's End. The latter was a group put together by former members of New Eden and joined by Rivera that released two studio albums, Breathe Deep the Dark in 1998 and Transition in 2002.

Reunions (2001–present)
Helstar went through several reunions starting in 2001. These reunions were primarily organized by James Rivera and longtime bassist Jerry Abarca.

Several live albums came out of this period, but the band was unable to produce any new material. In 2006, for the first time in over 15 years, James Rivera and Larry Barragan reunited and Helstar were officially declared musically active again. Along with Abarca, Rivera and Barragan, also reunited with the Remnants of War album were guitarist Rob Trevino and Eternity Black drummer Russell De'leon. This lineup has since released Sins of the Past, "a greatest hits collection" of re-recorded songs. A new album was released with the Remnants of War line-up in 2008 titled The King of Hell.

In 2013,  Helstar announced that bassist Jerry Abarca would take an extended break from the band due to a stomach related illness. Mike Lepond and Garrick Smith took on live bass duties for upcoming shows. Helstar released their ninth studio album This Wicked Nest on April 25, 2014. Andrew Atwood joined as second guitarist in 2016 and contributed to that year's album, Vampiro. The band's latest album, Clad In Black, was released in February 2021.

Members

Current members
 James Rivera - vocals (1982–present)
 Larry Barragan - guitars (1981–1995; 2006–present) 
 Michael Lewis - drums (2004–2006; 2010–present)
 Garrick Smith - bass (2014–present) 
 Andrew Atwood - guitars (2016–present)

Former members
Guitars 
 John Diaz (1981-1982) 
 Tom Rogers (1983–1984) 
 Rob Trevino (1985–1987; 2006–2016) 
 André Corbin (1987–1990) 
 Aaron Garza (1990-1996) 
 love D. Michael Heald (1994-1996) 
 Eric Halpern (2004-2006)

Drums
 Hector Pavon (1983–1984)
 Rene Luna (1985–1987)
 Frank Ferreira (1987–1990)
 Russel DeLeon (1990–2004; 2006–2009)

Bass
 Paul Medina (1983–1984) 
 Jerry Abarca (1985-2014)

Timeline

Discography
 Burning Star (Combat Records 1984)
 Remnants of War (Combat Records 1986)
 A Distant Thunder (Metal Blade Records 1988)
 Nosferatu (Metal Blade Records 1989)
 Multiples of Black (Massacre 1995)
 Twas The Night of a Helish Xmas (Metal Blade Records 2000) (live album)
 The James Rivera Legacy (Iron Glory 2001) (compilation)
 Sins Of The Past (AFM Records 2007) (compilation)
 The King of Hell (AFM Records 2008)
 Rising from the Grave (AFM Records 2010) (boxed set)
 Glory Of Chaos (AFM Records 2010)
 This Wicked Nest (AFM Records 2014)
 Vampiro (EMP Label Group 2016)
 Clad In Black (COMPIL-2021)

References

External links
 
 History of Helstar w/ Larry Barragan
 Helstar - Nosferatu Thrash Metal Cassette Metal Blade Records United States
 Picasa Web Albums - trc122797 - Helstar featu...

1982 establishments in Texas
American power metal musical groups
American speed metal musical groups
Heavy metal musical groups from Texas
Musical groups established in 1982
Musical groups from Houston
Musical quintets
Metal Blade Records artists
AFM Records artists